Luis Roberto Lobo Dubón (born 26 December 1987 in La Lima, Honduras) is a Honduran footballer who currently as a forward or midfielder for the Liga Nacional de Honduras club Parrillas One.

Club career
Lobo started his career at Real España. He became well-known thanks to his performance with the team on the 2010–11 Apertura, becoming an important player for winning the title.

In 2013, he was transferred to Parrillas One.

International career
Luis Lobo made his senior debut against El Salvador on 18 January 2013.

References

1987 births
Living people
People from Cortés Department
Association football midfielders
Honduran footballers
Honduras international footballers
Real C.D. España players
Parrillas One players
C.D. Honduras Progreso players
Liga Nacional de Fútbol Profesional de Honduras players
2013 Copa Centroamericana players